Ferchensee is a lake in Oberbayern, Bavaria, Germany, located at an elevation of 1060 metres. It is currently ranked #2 of 15 things to do in Mittenwald on TripAdvisor.

References

Lakes of Bavaria
LFerchensee